But I'm a Cheerleader is a 1999 American black comedy romantic teen film directed by Jamie Babbit in her feature directorial debut and written by Brian Wayne Peterson. Natasha Lyonne stars as Megan Bloomfield, a high school cheerleader whose parents send her to a residential in-patient conversion therapy camp to "cure" her lesbianism. The supporting cast includes Clea DuVall, Cathy Moriarty, RuPaul, and Melanie Lynskey. The film, which has developed a cult following, is noted for its satirical style and is generally considered to be one of the best LGBT films ever made.

Plot
Seventeen-year-old Megan Bloomfield is a happy high school senior who loves cheerleading and is dating Jared, a football player. However, she does not enjoy kissing Jared, instead preferring to look at her fellow cheerleaders. This, combined with her interests in vegetarianism and Melissa Etheridge, leads her parents, Peter and Nancy, and friends to suspect that she is a lesbian. Aided by ex-gay Mike, they surprise her with an intervention. She is then sent to True Directions, a two-month-long conversion therapy camp intended to convert attendees to heterosexuality via a five-step program in which they admit their homosexuality, "rediscover" their gender identity by performing stereotypically gender-associated tasks, find the root of their homosexuality, demystify the opposite sex, and simulate heterosexual intercourse. Upon arrival, she meets strict disciplinarian Mary J. Brown, who, according to the film's backstory, founded True Directions after her husband left her for another man. Mary's supposedly "heterosexual" son Rock is seen throughout the film to actually be overtly homosexual, making multiple sexual overtures towards Mike and the other male campers.

During the program, Megan befriends college student Graham Eaton; although more comfortable in her sexuality, she was forced to attend the camp or risk being disowned by her family after her stepmother caught her having sex with a girlfriend of hers in her room. She also meets several fellow adolescents and young adults trying to "cure" themselves of their homosexuality. The group's prompting forces her to reluctantly admit her lesbianism, which contradicts her traditional religious upbringing and distresses her, so she puts every effort into becoming heterosexual. Early on in her stay, she shockingly discovers retail worker Clayton Dunn making out with a fellow male camper and varsity wrestler named Dolph. After Mike catches them in the act, Dolph is dismissed from the premises and Clayton is punished with isolation, literally being sent to the doghouse for a week.

Two of Mary's former students, ex-ex-gays Larry and Lloyd Morgan-Gordon, encourage the campers to rebel against her by taking them to a local gay bar called Cocksucker, where Graham and Megan's relationship becomes romantic. Upon discovering what they did, Mary forces all of them to picket the couple's house, carrying placards and shouting homophobic abuse. Megan and Graham sneak away one night to have sex and begin to fall in love. When Mary discovers their escapade, Megan, now unapologetically comfortable with her sexuality, is dismissed from the premises. Graham, afraid that her continued defiance will result in her father potentially disinheriting her permanently, stays behind. 

Disowned by her parents and homeless, Megan goes to stay with Larry and Lloyd, discovering that Dolph now also lives with them. The pair plan to rescue Graham and Clayton by infiltrating the graduation ceremony. While Dolph successfully coaxes Clayton away, Graham nervously declines Megan's invitation to join them. She then performs a cheer she composed for Graham declaring her love for her, finally winning Graham over. They drive off with Dolph and Clayton. The final scene shows Peter and Nancy uncomfortably attending a PFLAG meeting to come to terms with their daughter's homosexuality.

Cast

Production

Background
But I'm a Cheerleader was Babbit's first feature film. She had previously directed two short films, Frog Crossing (1996) and Sleeping Beauties (1999). Babbit and producer Andrea Sperling secured financing from Michael Burns, vice president of Prudential Insurance, after showing him the script at Sundance festival. Their one-sentence pitch was "Two high-school girls fall in love at a reparative therapy camp." Burns gave an initial budget of US$500,000 which was increased to US$1 million when the film went into production.

Conception
Babbit, whose mother runs a halfway house called New Directions for young people with drug and alcohol problems, had wanted to make a comedy about rehabilitation and the 12-step program. After reading an article about a man who had returned from a reparative therapy camp hating himself, she decided to combine the two ideas. With girlfriend Sperling, she came up with the idea for a feature film about a cheerleader who attends reparative therapy. They wanted the main character to be a cheerleader because it is ... "the pinnacle of the American dream, and the American dream of femininity." She wanted the film to represent the lesbian experience from the femme perspective  contrasting with several films of the time that represented the butch perspective (Go Fish and The Watermelon Woman). She also wanted to satirize both the religious right and the gay community. Not feeling qualified to write the script herself, Babbit brought in screenwriter and recent graduate of USC School of Cinematic Arts Brian Wayne Peterson. Peterson had experience with reparative therapy while working at a prison clinic for sex offenders. He has said that he wanted to make a film that would not only entertain people, but also make people get angry and talk about the issues it raised.

Casting
Babbit recruited Clea DuVall who had starred in her short film Sleeping Beauties, to play the role of Graham Eaton. She was able to meet a lot of the cast through DuVall, including Natasha Lyonne and Melanie Lynskey. Lyonne first saw the script in the back of DuVall's car and  contacted her agent about it. She had seen and enjoyed Babbit's short Sleeping Beauties and was eager to work with her. She was not the first choice for the role of Megan. Another actress had wanted to play the part but eventually turned it down due to her religious belief and not wanting her family to see her on the poster. Rosario Dawson was also considered for Megan but her executive producer persuaded her that Dawson, who is Hispanic, would not be right for the All-American character.

A conscious effort was made to cast people of color in supporting roles to combat what she described as "racism at every level of making movies." From the beginning she intended the characters of Mike (played by RuPaul), Dolph (Dante Basco) and Andre (Douglas Spain) to be African American, Asian and Hispanic. She initially considered Arsenio Hall for the character of Mike but Hall was uncomfortable playing a gay role. As Mike, RuPaul made a rare appearance out of drag.

Set and costume design
Babbit says that her influences for the look and feel of the film included John Waters, David LaChapelle, Edward Scissorhands and Barbie. She wanted the production and costume design to reflect the themes of the story.

The progression from the ordinary world of Megan's home life where the dominant colors are muted oranges and browns, to the contrived world of True Directions with intense blues and pinks, is intended to represent the artificiality of heteronormativity.

The germaphobic character of Mary Brown represents AIDS paranoia and her clean, ordered world is filled with plastic flowers, fake sky and PVC outfits. The external shots of the colorful house complete with bright pink agricultural fencing were filmed in Palmdale, California.

Themes

But I'm a Cheerleader contains themes of sexuality, gender roles and social conformity. Chris Holmlund in Contemporary American Independent Film notes this feature of the film and calls the costumes "gender-tuned." Ted Gideonse in Out magazine wrote "the costumes and colors of the film show how false the goals of True Directions are".

Rating and distribution
When originally submitted to the Motion Picture Association of America rating board, But I'm a Cheerleader received an NC-17 rating. In order to get a commercially viable R rating, Babbit removed a two-second shot of Graham's hand sweeping Megan's clothed body, a camera pan of Megan's body when she is masturbating, and a comment that Megan "ate Graham out".

Babbit was interviewed by Kirby Dick for his 2006 documentary film This Film Is Not Yet Rated. The film suggests that films with homosexual content are treated more stringently than those with only heterosexual content, and that scenes of female sexuality draw harsher criticism from the board than those of male sexuality. Babbit stated that she felt discriminated against for making a gay film. The film was rated as M (for mature audiences 15 and older) in Australia and in New Zealand, 14A in Canada, 12 in Germany and 15 in the United Kingdom.

The film premiered on September 12, 1999, at the Toronto International Film Festival and was screened in January 2000 at the Sundance Film Festival. It was shown at other international film festivals including the Sydney Gay and Lesbian Mardi Gras festival and the London Lesbian and Gay Film Festival. It first appeared in US theaters on July 7, 2000, distributed by Lions Gate Entertainment.

The film was first released to home video by Universal Studios on October 3, 2000, and by Lions Gate on July 22, 2002. It was released on Region 2 DVD on June 2, 2003, by Prism Leisure.

In honor of the film's 20th anniversary, the director's cut of But I'm a Cheerleader was released on December 8, 2020, via video on demand and on Blu-Ray on June 1, 2021.

Reception

Box office and audience reaction
But I'm a Cheerleader grossed $2,595,216 worldwide. In its opening weekend, showing at four theaters, it earned $60,410 which was 2.7% of its total gross. According to Box Office Mojo, it ranked at 174 for all films released in the US in 2000 and 74 for R-rated films released that year. The film was a hit with festival audiences and received standing ovations at the San Francisco International Lesbian and Gay Film Festival. It has been described as a favorite with gay audiences and on the art house circuit.

Critical response
Initial mainstream critical response to But I'm a Cheerleader was mostly negative. On Rotten Tomatoes, it has an approval rating of 42% from 89 reviews, with the site's critical consensus stating, "Too broad to make any real statements, But I'm a Cheerleader isn't as sharp as it should be, but a charming cast and surprisingly emotional center may bring enough pep for viewers looking for a light social satire." On Metacritic, it has a weighted average score of 39 out of 100 based on 30 critics, indicating "generally unfavorable reviews." Elvis Mitchell of The New York Times praised Lyonne and DuVall for their performances. Kevin Thomas of the Los Angeles Times described the movie as having "jaunty, superficial humor" that "tends more to confirm homosexual stereotypes for easy laughter than to skewer the horror of [conversion therapy]". Emanuel Levy of Variety described it as a "shallow, only mildly entertaining satire".

Reviews from gay media were positive, and the film has undergone a critical reassessment over time, being analyzed in recent times as a deliberately satirical and campy take on the subject matter. Feminist website Autostraddle declared the film to be number one in a list of the "100 best lesbian movies of all time" in 2015 AfterEllen.com named it "one of the five best lesbian movies ever made"; the site had considered the movie's story "predictable" and characters "stereotypical" in its initial 2006 review. Curve called the film an "incredible comedy" that had "redefined lesbian film."

Awards
The film won the Audience Award and the Graine de Cinéphage Award at the 2000 Créteil International Women's Film Festival.

It was nominated by the Political Film Society of America for the PFS Award in the categories of Human Rights and Exposé the same year.

Music
Pat Irwin composed the score for But I'm a Cheerleader. The soundtrack has never been released on CD.

Artists featured include Saint Etienne, Dressy Bessy, April March and RuPaul.

Track listing
 "Chick Habit (Laisse tomber les filles)" (Elinor Blake, Serge Gainsbourg) performed by April March
 "Just Like Henry" (Tammy Ealom, John Hill, Rob Greene, Darren Albert) performed by Dressy Bessy
 "If You Should Try and Kiss Her" (Ealom, Hill, Greene, Albert) performed by Dressy Bessy
 "Trailer Song" (Courtney Holt, Joy Ray) performed by Sissy Bar
 "All or Nothing" (Cris Owen, Miisa) performed by Miisa
 "We're in the City" (Sarah Cracknell, Bob Stanley, Pete Wiggs) performed by Saint Etienne
 "The Swisher" (Dave Moss, Ian Rich) performed by Summer's Eve
 "Funnel of Love" (Kent Westbury, Charlie McCoy) performed by Wanda Jackson
 "Ray of Sunshine" (Go Sailor) performed by Go Sailor
 "Glass Vase Cello Case" (Madigan Shive, Jen Wood) performed by Tattle Tale
 "Party Train" (RuPaul) performed by RuPaul
 "Evening in Paris" (Lois Maffeo) performed by Lois Maffeo
 "Together Forever in Love" (Go Sailor) performed by Go Sailor

Legacy 
The music video for the 2021 song "Silk Chiffon" by musical group Muna with Phoebe Bridgers pays homage to But I'm a Cheerleader and features much of the film's iconography, Guitarist Naomi McPherson said they wanted "a song for kids to have their first gay kiss to."

Musical
In 2005 the New York Musical Theatre Festival featured a musical stage adaptation of But I'm a Cheerleader written by lyricist Bill Augustin and composer Andrew Abrams. With 18 original songs, it was directed by Daniel Goldstein and starred Chandra Lee Schwartz as Megan. It played during September 2005 at New York's Theatre at St. Clement's. The musical was also performed as part of MT Fest UK from 18 to 20 February 2019 at The Other Palace, London with a cast featuring Bronté Barbé as Megan, Carrie Hope Fletcher as Graham, Jamie Muscato as Jared, Matt Henry as Mike, Ben Forster as Larry, Stephen Hogan as Lloyd and Luke Bayer as Clayton.

A production of the musical played at the Turbine Theatre in London, beginning previews 18 February 2022 and with an opening night of 23 February, running until 16 April. It was directed by Tania Azevedo, choreographed by Alexzandra Sarmiento, with lighting by Martha Godfrey, and produced by Paul Taylor-Mills and Bill Kenwright, in association with Adam Bialow. The musical played the same theatre that fall, running from 7 October to 27 November.

TV series
In April 2018, Babbit announced on Twitter that a But I'm a Cheerleader television series was in development with Starz.

See also
 List of LGBT films directed by women

External links

References 

1999 films
1999 directorial debut films
1999 independent films
1999 LGBT-related films
1999 romantic comedy films
1990s coming-of-age comedy films
1990s satirical films
1990s teen comedy films
1990s teen romance films
American coming-of-age comedy-drama films
American independent films
American romantic comedy films
American satirical films
American teen LGBT-related films
American teen romance films
Cheerleading films
Coming-of-age romance films
Films about conversion therapy
1990s English-language films
Films about anti-LGBT sentiment
Films about interracial romance
Films about sexual repression
Films directed by Jamie Babbit
Films produced by Andrea Sperling
Films shot in Los Angeles County, California
Lesbian-related films
Gay-related films
The Kushner-Locke Company films
LGBT-related comedy films
LGBT-related coming-of-age films
LGBT-related romantic comedy films
LGBT-related satirical films
Vegetarianism in fiction
1990s American films